Douglas Wayne Martin, commonly known as Wayne Martin (c. 1951 – 19 April 1993), was an African-American Branch Davidian and Harvard-trained attorney. He worked as an attorney in multiple fields, including contract, child custody, and real estate law, and provided the proceeds to the Branch Davidians. He was nominally married to Sheila Judith Martin, another Branch Davidian, but she was "carnally" married to David Koresh, the Branch Davidian leader. Wayne and Sheila had six children, three of whom died in the 1993 fire. Sheila had two more children with Koresh. In total, four children died in the 19 April fire: Wayne Joseph, 20; Anita, 18; Sheila Renee, 15; and Lisa Martin, 13. Sheila Martin, who left Mount Carmel Center on 21 March in the middle of the siege, eventually won custody over the three surviving children: James, Daniel, and Kimberly Martin. Wayne Martin was present at Mount Carmel Center when the 28 February 1993 raid occurred. He was the first person in the compound to call 9-1-1 to local authorities and asked to call off the raid for risk of harming women and children. He was considered the second- or third-in-command at Mt. Carmel, behind or equal to Steve Schneider. He died in the 19 April 1993 fire with three of his children. Wayne Martin was a character in the 2018 miniseries Waco, played by Demore Barnes.

Early life, education, and career 
Martin was born to Joseph and Helen Martin in Queens, New York City, where he grew up. He attended City College of the City University of New York system as an undergraduate history major, where he made the Dean's list. He received a law degree from Harvard Law School in 1977, and he worked as an assistant professor at North Carolina Central University law school for seven years starting in 1978. He also worked as a law librarian at North Carolina Central University until 1985. He also received a master's degree in business administration from Columbia University, according to The Dallas Morning News. He was admitted to the Texas Bar in 1988, and he was also a member of the Pennsylvania Bar.

He was friends with Lawrence Johnson, a lawyer, Waco City Council member, and president of the McLennan County chapter of the National Association for the Advancement of Colored People (NAACP), for approximately five years.

Martin joined the Branch Davidians in 1985 when introduced to them through his wife Sheila J. Martin.

Waco siege and death 

Martin was the first person to call 9-1-1 when the Bureau of Alcohol, Tobacco, and Firearms (ATF) began a raid of the Mt. Carmel compound on 28 February 1993. He called at 9:48 am local time (UTC–5:00). In the call, he claimed to Larry Lynch, a McLennan County sheriff's deputy, that the ATF shot first. Martin later that same morning called Lawrence Johnson to ask him to contact the media about the raid, and he sent Johnson money to reimburse clients he could not represent while besieged in the Mt. Carmel compound. He also spoke to Gary Coker, a Waco lawyer who represented Branch Davidians, before the Federal Bureau of Investigation (FBI) cut the telephone lines. Later, by at least 6 March 1993, Coker spoke with Martin to discuss a film production deal that Hollywood executives offered the Branch Davidians after the start of the siege.

Of all the people FBI negotiators spoke to on a Hostage-Rescue-Team-provided telephone, Martin was one of two people who the FBI spoke to face-to-face (the other being Steve Schneider).

Martin died of smoke inhalation and burns in the auditorium area of Mt. Carmel Center, sometimes reported as a "concrete bunker." His body was identified using dental records.

Impact on criminal and civil trials 

Eleven Branch Davidians stood trial over their involvement in the shootout on the 28 February 1993 raid that started the siege. Martin's 9-1-1 call was used as evidence in favor of the eleven Branch Davidians, who argued they fired at the ATF agents in self-defense. The eleven defendants and their legal team used the call as evidence that the ATF agents shot at the Branch Davidians first, and as such they returned fire in self-defense.

In addition to the criminal trial, surviving Branch Davidians brought a multimillion-dollar lawsuit against the federal government for the wrongful deaths in the botched 28 February ATF raid and 19 April 1993 fire. The tape of Martin's initial call to 9-1-1 and Larry Lynch was shown to an advisory jury in an effort to ascertain if the Branch Davidians were returning fire in self-defense and if the ATF agents were negligent in a random use of force.

See also 
 Waco siege
 Branch Davidians
 Waco (miniseries)

References 

Branch Davidians
African-American lawyers
African-American librarians
Harvard Law School alumni
City College of New York alumni
Columbia Business School alumni
North Carolina Central University faculty
Waco siege
Deaths from fire in the United States
Death in Texas
1950s births
1993 deaths
Year of birth uncertain